Paulo Afonso Bonamigo (born 23 September 1960) is a Brazilian professional football coach and former player who most recently managed Clube do Remo.

Career
Born in Ijuí, Rio Grande do Sul, Bonamigo started his career playing for Grêmio. Later he went on to play for other teams such as Internacional, Botafogo-RJ, and Bahia.

Bonamigo started his coaching career in 1998 with Madureira, before taking over Joinville in the same year. In 2000 trains Sampaio Corrêa, Remo and Mogi Mirim while in the two following years is at Paraná. In 2002 and 2003 trains Coritiba the mind in 2004, after being coach of Atlético Mineiro, where is Botafogo relieved to mid-season to then be hired by Palmeiras, where it remains up to the rest of the championship in 2005.

In the summer of 2005 he moved in Maritimo where fails to achieve success and then decides to return to train in Brazil, before again Coritiba then Fortaleza, Goiás, Paraná, Ponte Preta, Portuguesa and subsequently in Bahia.

In 2009 Bonamigo moves in the Al Shabab where it remains until the end of the season 2011-2012 winning a cup of the UAE League Cup and qualifying the team for two seasons following AFC Champions League then move from Dubai in Al Jazira where it remains for mid-season before being exempted due to the lack of results.

Honors

Player
 Grêmio
 Campeonato Gaúcho: 1980, 1985, 1986, 1987, 1988
 Campeonato Brasileiro Série A: 1981
 Copa Libertadores: 1983
 Intercontinental Cup: 1983

Internacional
 Campeonato Gaúcho: 1991

Coach
Coritiba
 Campeonato Paranaense: 2003

Fortaleza
 Campeonato Cearense: 2007

Al Shabab
 UAE League Cup: 2010–11
 GCC Champions League: 2011

Remo
Campeonato Paraense: 2022

References

1960 births
Living people
People from Ijuí
Brazilian footballers
Brazilian football managers
Brazilian expatriate football managers
Expatriate football managers in Portugal
Expatriate football managers in the United Arab Emirates
Campeonato Brasileiro Série A players
Campeonato Brasileiro Série A managers
Campeonato Brasileiro Série B managers
Campeonato Brasileiro Série C managers
Primeira Liga managers
Grêmio Foot-Ball Porto Alegrense players
Sport Club Internacional players
Botafogo de Futebol e Regatas players
Esporte Clube Bahia players
Madureira Esporte Clube managers
Joinville Esporte Clube managers
Sampaio Corrêa Futebol Clube managers
Clube do Remo managers
Mogi Mirim Esporte Clube managers
Paraná Clube managers
Coritiba Foot Ball Club managers
Clube Atlético Mineiro managers
Botafogo de Futebol e Regatas managers
Sociedade Esportiva Palmeiras managers
C.S. Marítimo managers
Fortaleza Esporte Clube managers
Goiás Esporte Clube managers
Associação Atlética Ponte Preta managers
Associação Portuguesa de Desportos managers
Esporte Clube Bahia managers
Al Shabab Al Arabi Club managers
Al Jazira Club managers
Al-Sharjah SCC managers
Al-Qadisiyah FC managers
Expatriate football managers in Saudi Arabia
Association football midfielders
Saudi Professional League managers
Sportspeople from Rio Grande do Sul